Bryan Edmund "Moose" Haas (born April 22, 1956) is a former professional baseball player who pitched in Major League Baseball (MLB) from 1976 to 1987. He appeared in the 1982 World Series as a member of the Milwaukee Brewers.

Haas initially signed a letter of intent to play college baseball at Clemson before being drafted in the second round of the 1974 Major League Baseball draft by the Brewers.

On April 12, 1978, Haas struck out 14 New York Yankees, including Reggie Jackson 4 times, breaking the record for strikeouts in a single game for the Brewers. This franchise record stood for 26 years until it was broken by Ben Sheets. In 1983, he led the American League in pitcher winning percentage (.813) with 13 wins and 3 losses. Haas spent the first ten seasons of his career in Milwaukee before being traded to the Oakland Athletics in 1986 for Steve Kiefer, Charlie O'Brien and two minor league players.

Haas publicly stated that his father gave him that nickname upon birth: "My father gave it to me when I was born. I wasn't that big, only seven and a quarter pounds, but I guess I looked to my father like I was going to be big. It didn't work out."

References

External links

1956 births
Living people
Baseball players from Baltimore
Major League Baseball pitchers
Newark Co-Pilots players
Burlington Bees players
Spokane Indians players
Milwaukee Brewers players
Oakland Athletics players